The Pontchartrain Expressway is a parallel six-lane section of Interstate 10 (I-10) and U.S. Route 90 Business (US 90 Bus.) in New Orleans, Louisiana, USA, with a brief stand-alone section in between junctions with these highways. The designation begins on I-10 near the Orleans–Jefferson parish line at the I-610 Split. The expressway follows I-10 into the Central Business District (CBD) of New Orleans (by the Superdome) and then follows US 90 Bus. to the Crescent City Connection. The expressway takes its name from Pontchartrain Boulevard, which the expressway replaced in some areas. The Pontchartrain name is derived from Lake Pontchartrain, which New Orleans' northern border traverses.

History
Construction of the Pontchartrain Expressway began in the 1950s.  It would later be incorporated into Interstate 10.  I-10 enters Orleans Parish after crossing the 17th Street Canal; this is where the expressway designation begins.  At the vicinity of West End Boulevard/Florida Avenue exit, the expressway turns to the southeast along the right-of-way for the former New Basin Canal which had been filled in between 1937 and 1947.  The expressway continues along this right-of-way as I-10 until a stack interchange with U.S. 90 (Claiborne Avenue) in the CBD.

At this interchange, I-10 breaks off to the northeast and Business U.S. 90 begins.  The expressway continues southeast along the upriver side of the CBD as an elevated highway that leads to the Crescent City Connection.  This section was completed by the 1958 opening of the Crescent City Connection.

The Business U.S. 90 portion of the expressway was expanded in the mid 1980s to accommodate the second span of the Crescent City Connection which opened in 1988. This stretch of the expressway and the stack interchange of I-10 and U.S. 90 received further reconstruction in the early 1990s, including two reversible HOV lanes that stretch from the intersection of Earhart Boulevard and Magnolia Street (underneath the Pontchartrain Expressway) across the Crescent City Connection to the Westbank Expressway. Reconstruction of the northern end of the expressway in the I-610 Split vicinity was undertaken in the late 1990s. Also in the late 1990s, further work was done on the expressway as two ramps were constructed, connecting West I-10 to West Business U.S. 90 and westbound Claiborne Avenue (West US 90), replacing an earlier, more dangerous ramp. The direct ramp from 90B East to I-10 East was completed by 1989. 

The Norfolk Southern Railway has an overpass crossing near the Metairie Cemetery between the City Park Avenue and West End Boulevard/Florida Avenue exits. The expressway dips down to 12 feet (3.7 m) below sea level to allow for the rail line to pass overhead. This area once experienced flooding on a regular basis in heavy thunderstorms and tropical systems. The problem was so common, a depth meter was painted on the overpass support columns to warn drivers of the water's depth. A new pumping station was completed adjacent to the expressway in 2004 to keep this area dry and allow the interstate to remain open in the event of an evacuation.

Hurricane Katrina

In the aftermath of Hurricane Katrina, this pumping station was overwhelmed and the railroad underpass and the entire I-610/West End Boulevard interchange was extensively flooded.  In fact, the 17th Street Canal breach is about one mile (1.6 km) north of this area.  This flooding cut Orleans Parish off from most areas to the west, making the Crescent City Connection one of the few clear routes into the east bank of Orleans Parish.  Areas under the elevated portions of the expressway in the CBD area saw flooding in the vicinity of the Superdome but for the most part remained dry and undamaged.  Some evacuees trapped in the city for days after Katrina attempted to use the expressway and the Crescent City Connection to walk to dry ground on the west bank.

Interstates 49 and 910

The Business U.S. 90 portion of the Pontchartrain Expressway is also designated as Interstate 910, however it is not signed as such.  This is a temporary designation that overlaps all freeway portions of Business U.S. 90 (the Pontchartrain Expressway, Crescent City Connection, and Westbank Expressway).  When Interstate 49 is completed from Lafayette to New Orleans, Business U.S. 90/Interstate 910 will be re-signed as Interstate 49.

Exit list

References

Roads in Louisiana
Transportation in New Orleans
Streets in New Orleans
Freeways in the United States
Interstate 10
U.S. Route 90
Interstate 49